Claude-Ambroise Seurat (10 April 1797 or 4 April 1798 – after 1833) was a freak show attraction from Troyes, France. He was known as "the anatomical man or the living skeleton" due to his extraordinarily low body weight.

Life 
The date of Seurat's birth is uncertain, being variously reported as either 10 April 1797 or 4 April 1798. Seurat's tours across Europe aroused controversy and because of the publicity, there was extensive interest in his life, particularly from the medical establishment. An account, for instance, cited that Seurat was born healthy and was normal like other children except for his depressed chest. 

By age 14, his health dwindled so that his frame already became skeletal in form.

Seurat's last recorded performance was in 1833 at Dinan in Brittany.

Seurat was also the subject of an anatomical drawing of Francisco Goya after the Spanish painter met him in 1826 at a circus in Bordeaux.

The date of Seurat's death is unknown. In 1868, Gilbert Richard Redgrave commented: "I have not yet been able to ascertain the date of his death. Who knows whether the poor fellow may not still be going the round of the French fairs?"

After his death it was discovered that a tapeworm had been depriving Suerat of nutrition.

References

External links

Memoir in ebook form
Engraving

People from Troyes
Sideshow performers

Date of birth uncertain
Date of death unknown
Place of death unknown
Year of birth uncertain
Year of death unknown
19th-century French people